George Boyle may refer to:

George Boyle (priest) (1828–1901), Dean of Salisbury
George Boyle, 4th Earl of Glasgow  (1766–1843), Scottish politician
George Boyle, 6th Earl of Glasgow (1825–1890), Scottish politician
George Frederick Boyle (1886–1948), Australian-American musician

See also
George Boyle White (1802–1876), Australian politician
George Hanna (politician, born 1877) (George Boyle Hanna, 1877–1938),  Northern Irish politician
George Hanna (politician, born 1906) (George Boyle Hanna, 1906–1964),  Northern Irish politician
William George Boyle (1830–1908), British soldier and politician